Vasile Ilie "Lică" Jula (born 13 December 1974) is a retired Romanian footballer who played as a defender.

Career
Jula began his career at Universitatea Cluj, playing in the 1995 UEFA Intertoto Cup. He later went on to play for Gloria Bistriţa before moving to CFR Cluj during the summer of 2004. After 3 years at CFR, in which he played in the 1995 UEFA Intertoto Cup final, "Lică" Jula moved to Dacia Mioveni and after one season he signed with FC Zalău where he played for 5 years, his last years as a player. In the first part of the 2013–14 season Jula was the manager of the team under the Meseș Hill. In April 2021, Jula was the caretaker manager of SCM Zalău.

International career
In 2005, he was called up by coach Victor Pițurcă to play for Romania, but he was only a reserve during the 2006 World Cup qualification game against Finland.

Honours
CFR Cluj
UEFA Intertoto Cup runner-up: 2005

Notes

References

External links

1974 births
Living people
Romanian footballers
Association football defenders
Liga I players
Liga II players
FC Universitatea Cluj players
ACF Gloria Bistrița players
CFR Cluj players
CS Mioveni players
FC Zalău players
Romanian football managers
People from Dej